Hannah Hatherly Maynard (Bude, 1834 – Victoria, 1918) was a Canadian photographer best known for her portrait work and experimental photography involving photomontage and multiple exposures. She also photographed people using techniques that made them appear as statuary: on columns or posing as if they were made of stone.

Early life and career beginnings

She was born in 1834 as Hannah Hatherly, in Bude, Cornwall.  Hatherly married in 1852 Richard Maynard, an apprentice boot-maker, and in the same year they emigrated to Bowmanville in Canada West (present-day Ontario), where four of their five children were born.  In 1858, Richard joined the exodus of gold-seekers on the Fraser River in British Columbia, and his venture appears to have been profitable. While her husband was out west, Maynard learned the basics of photography, most likely from R & H O'Hara Photographers, in Bowmanville. After selling the boot store, in 1862 the family moved to Victoria on the Colony of Vancouver Island.  Richard soon left for the Stikine River to take up placer mining, and it is believed that in 1862 Hannah opened up her first photographic studio, Mrs. R. Maynard's Photographic Gallery.  Upon his return home in 1863, Richard found his wife successfully entrenched as a photographer, and by 1864 Hannah had taught her husband the principles of photography while he operated a second boot store.

Hannah and Richard Maynard

In the ensuing years, Hannah and Richard had contrasting photographic specialties.  Hannah was best known for her portrait work and at the same time managed darkroom affairs and studio promotion, while Richard focused almost exclusively on outdoor photography. The couple frequently traveled together, in 1875 to purchase photographic equipment in San Francisco, in 1879 on a pleasure cruise around Vancouver Island, and to Banff in the late 1880s. Hannah also made a solo trip to the Queen Charlotte Islands sometime in the same decade. Richard continued to travel on his own, to Alaska three times, and throughout British Columbia, sometimes sponsored by government commissions, and in 1892 he traveled to the Pribilof Islands in the Bering Sea. While they published their photographs under separate imprints, it is sometimes unclear in the case of landscape views whether Hannah or Richard was the photographer.

Portraiture and experimental photography

Maynard's portrait work encompassed several different formats following the fashions of the day, cartes-de-visite in the 1860s, cabinet cards in the following decade, as well as larger-sized prints. The Maynard studio is known to have produced forty-three cartes-de-visite of native people, often Victoria street vendors.  Maynard was a master of lighting technique, and she was one of the early adopters of line-lit photography to highlight facial features.  Her backgrounds were often highly ornamental, utilizing painted backgrounds and elaborate domestic interiors and props.

Starting about 1880, Maynard began to experiment with photomontage in her Gems of British Columbia series which she created  each year between 1881 and 1895.  Conceived as an annual greeting card to be sent out on New Years to all the mothers of children she had photographed in the preceding year, it was very popular. She cut out the outline of the photograph of each baby or child, and then mounted the images on a pane of window glass and re-photographed the whole. She began to incorporate the montages of previous years in symbolist patterns, resulting in compositions that included up to 22,000 individual photographs. Her Gems of 1885 was published and praised by the St. Louis and Canadian Photographer in 1886, bringing Maynard a measure of recognition throughout North America.

Beginning in 1883 Maynard was struck by personal tragedy, with the death of her 16-year-old daughter Lillian of typhoid fever, followed in later years by another daughter Emma and daughter-in-law Adelaide, and some of her photographs began to take on the aspect of a memorial to the departed. It was also in this period that she took an interest in seances and Spiritualism. She began in the 1880s to create a type of photograph described by her as "Living Statuary" or "Statuary from Life", the sitter often appearing as a bust on a pedestal. Her experimentation developed further into the realm of multiple exposure, and some photographs show as many as four or five likenesses of Maynard, often engaged in different tasks, or in one notable image, holding a single garland of flowers. A selection of her double and multiple exposure photographs were published in the St. Louis and Canadian Photographer in 1894. Another difficult technique that Maynard pursued was that of bas-relief, which involved the embossing of a photograph. Around 1897, Maynard discontinued her investigations of trick photography.

Later years and legacy

Between 1897 and 1902, while continuing her studio portraiture, Maynard was the official photographer of the Victoria Police Department, producing mug shots as required. In 1907 her husband Richard died, and in 1912 she retired, selling her photographic equipment to a local Chinese photographer. She summarized her achievement by stating that "I think I can say with confidence that we photographed everyone in the town at one time or another." Maynard died in 1918 in Victoria at the age of 84.  She is buried in Ross Bay Cemetery.

A play by Janet Munsil based on the life of Maynard, Be Still, premiered at Richmond's Gateway Theatre on March 1, 2001 and opened at Victoria's Belfry Theatre on March 14 of the same year. Elizabeth Lazebnik subsequently adapted the play into the film Be Still, in which Maynard was portrayed by Piercey Dalton. Lazebnik also previously made a short film about Maynard, The Multiple Selves of Hannah Maynard, in 2005.

Gallery

Notes

References

Sources

External links
Hannah Hatherly Maynard photographs at Wikimedia Commons
Hannah Maynard at the National Gallery of Canada
Hannah Hatherly Maynard at the Canadian Women Artists History Database

1834 births
1918 deaths
Artists from Victoria, British Columbia
Canadian women photographers
English emigrants to pre-Confederation Ontario
Immigrants to the Province of Canada
People from Bude